is a retired Japanese athlete who specialised in the 110 metres hurdles. He represented his country at the 2000 and 2004 Summer Olympics reaching the second round on both occasions.

His personal best of 13.39 (+1.5 m/s), set in the heats of the 2004 Olympic Games, is the current national record.

Competition record

References

1972 births
Living people
Athletes from Tokyo
Japanese male hurdlers
Olympic male hurdlers
Olympic athletes of Japan
Athletes (track and field) at the 2000 Summer Olympics
Athletes (track and field) at the 2004 Summer Olympics
Asian Games silver medalists for Japan
Asian Games medalists in athletics (track and field)
Athletes (track and field) at the 1998 Asian Games
Athletes (track and field) at the 2002 Asian Games
Medalists at the 2002 Asian Games
World Athletics Championships athletes for Japan
Japan Championships in Athletics winners